Are You Passionate? is the 24th studio album by Canadian / American musician Neil Young, his only album to feature Booker T. & the M.G.'s, and his eighth with Crazy Horse, released on April 9, 2002 as a double LP and as a single CD. It represents Young's foray into soul music, not sounding like anything he had previously released. Exceptions are rocker "Goin' Home", recorded with Crazy Horse, and the brooding "Let's Roll", a response to the 9/11 terrorist attacks. The album ends with "She's a Healer", an extended jam.

The track "Gateway of Love" is listed on the back cover, but not included on the album. The song wasn't released until 2022 on the Toast album, but was played in concert with Crazy Horse during 28 of 29 dates of their European tour in 2001. A bootleg recording of the performance at Rotterdam Ahoy Sportpaleis, Rotterdam (July 24, 2001) exists in which the song runs 8:36 minutes.

Critical reception
Are You Passionate? was met with "mixed or average" reviews from critics. At Metacritic, which assigns a weighted average rating out of 100 to reviews from mainstream publications, this release received an average score of 54 based on 17 reviews.

In a review for AllMusic, critic reviewer Stephen Thomas Erlewine wrote: "Instead of sounding like a refreshing change of pace, it's a muddled, aimless affair from an artist who's had too many middling efforts over the last decade." At The Austin Chronicle, Raoul Hernandez admitted the "songs are too long, too slow, and they all sound the same." Billboard called it the "great next step in Young's career but also the best album he could have issued right now."

Track listing

Personnel
Neil Young - vocals, guitar, piano
Booker T. Jones - organ, vibes, vocals
Donald Dunn - bass, vocal on "Differently"
Steve Potts - drums, bongos, tambourine
Frank "Poncho" Sampedro - guitar, vocals
Tom Bray - trumpet
Pegi Young - vocals
Astrid Young - vocals

Except "Goin' Home" (Neil Young & Crazy Horse):
Neil Young - vocals, guitar
Frank "Poncho" Sampedro - guitar, vocals
Billy Talbot - bass
Ralph Molina - drums, vocals

Charts

References

2002 albums
Neil Young albums
Reprise Records albums
Albums produced by Neil Young
Albums produced by Donald "Duck" Dunn
Albums produced by Frank Sampedro
Albums produced by Booker T. Jones
Soul albums by Canadian artists